Capparis loranthifolia, also known as the narrowleaf bumble or narrow-leaved bumble tree, is a shrub or small tree in the caper family. It is native to the deserts and arid shrublands of northern and eastern Australia as far south as northern New South Wales.

Infraspecific taxa
 Capparis loranthifolia var. loranthifolia
 Capparis loranthifolia var. bancroftii M.Jacobs

Description
The species grows as a densely-foliaged, thorny shrub or small tree to 2–8 m in height. It has dark, grey-brown, fissured  and cracked bark. The leaves are 30–70 mm long by 8–10 mm wide. The cream-coloured flowers have petals 20 mm long. The round fruits are 30–40 mm in diameter.

References

 
loranthifolia
Endemic flora of Australia
Flora of New South Wales
Flora of the Northern Territory
Flora of Queensland
Flora of Western Australia
Rosids of Australia
Plants described in 1848
Taxa named by John Lindley